Susuwatari ("wandering soot"), also called Makkuro kurosuke ("makkuro" meaning "pitch black", "kuro" meaning "black" and "-suke" being a common ending for boys names), is the name of a fictitious sprite that was devised by Hayao Miyazaki and Studio Ghibli, known from the famous anime-productions My Neighbor Totoro (1988) and Spirited Away (2001) where, in the former, they are identified as "black soots" in early subtitles, as "soot sprites" or "dust bunnies" in the Streamline Pictures English dub, and as "soot gremlins" in the Walt Disney Studios English dubbed version.

Description 
Susuwatari are described and shown as golf ball-sized, pitch-black and fuzzy-haired beings with two large eyes and long, thin limbs. They move by hovering around, but they can extend stick-like limbs from their bodies to do certain tasks, and can lift objects many times their own weight. They make a squeaky murmuring sound when excited, and dissolve into powder (soot) if crushed.

My Neighbor Totoro
In My Neighbor Totoro, the house the main characters move into is full of Susuwatari, which are rationalized as Makkuro Kurosuke, an optical illusion caused by moving quickly from light into darkness. Seeing that the family is made of good people, the Susuwatari leave the house to move to another abandoned area.

Spirited Away
They later reappeared in Spirited Away as workers in Kamaji's boiler room.

The protagonist Sen (Chihiro) befriends a number of them by helping them carry coal. Sen is told that if these Susuwatari are not given a job to do, they turn back into soot. Another character, Lin, feeds the Susuwatari much like farmers feed chickens, throwing handfuls of the Japanese candy konpeitō onto the ground for them to eat. After Sen is accepted among the staff of the bathhouse, chiefly by Kamaji and Lin, the Susuwatari become almost admiring of her, and help her in their small ways.

Zen - Grogu and Dust Bunnies
In 2022, Studio Ghibli and Lucasfilm collaborated on a Star Wars short for Disney+ where The Mandalorian character Grogu interacts with a band of dust bunnies that gift him a flower.

See also
 Dust bunny

References

Citations

Bibliography 
 
 
 Hayao Miyazaki, Yuji Oniki: Spirited Away. Viz Communications, San Francisco, 2003, 
 Hayao Miyazaki: My neighbour Totoro. Viz Communications, San Francisco, 2005, 
 Julien R. Fielding: Discovering world religions at twenty-four frames per second. Scarecrow Press, 2008, page 317.
 Patrick Drazen: A Gathering of Spirits: Japan's Ghost Story Tradition: from Folklore and Kabuki to Anime and Manga. iUniverse, New York 2011, page 144.
 Ayumi Suzuki: Animating the chaos: Contemporary Japanese anime, cinema, and postmodernity. ProQuest, Carbondale 2008, page 14.
 Nakamura, Tamah, Professor. "Spirited Away." "Hayao Miyazaki's World" 'Best of' Booklet, edited by Hiroshi Kudo and Bobby Recinos, PDF ed., Kyushu University, 2013, pp. 17–91.
 Hartman, Emma. "Tradition vs. Innovation and the Creatures in Spirited Away." Digital Literature Review, PDF ed., vol. 4, no. 4, pp. 1–13.

Hayao Miyazaki
Studio Ghibli
Fictional yōkai
Fictional fairies and sprites
Film characters introduced in 1988